Murray Jamieson (born 8 December 1952) is a New Zealand cricketer. He played in five first-class and eight List A matches for Central Districts from 1980 to 1983.

See also
 List of Central Districts representative cricketers

References

External links
 

1952 births
Living people
New Zealand cricketers
Central Districts cricketers
Cricketers from Dunedin